This is the discography of rapper Z-Ro.

Albums

Studio albums

Collaborative albums

Compilation albums

Mixtapes 
2003: A Bad Azz Mix Tape
2003: Gangstafied
2004: Underground Railroad, Vol. 1: Street Life (Hulled & Chopped)
2004: Underground Railroad, Vol. 2: Thug Luv
2005: Z-Ro and Friends
2006: Underground Railroad, Vol. 3: Paper Stacks Hulled
2009: No Nutt No Glory
2009: Rodeine
2009: My Favorite Mixtape
2009: Relvis Presley
2011: Mo City Playaz
2011: The 5200 Mixtape
2013: Tripolar EP (Released under The Mo City Don)

Singles

Featured performer singles

Promotional singles

Guest appearances

Music videos

References

Hip hop discographies
Discographies of American artists